Aulos is a former commune in the Ariège department in the Occitanie region of south-western France. On 1 January 2019, it was merged into the new commune Aulos-Sinsat.

The inhabitants of the commune are known as Aulosois or Aulosoises.

Geography
Aulos is located some 12 km south-east of Tarascon-sur-Ariège and 22 km north-west of Ax-les-Thermes. Access to the commune is by Route nationale 20 from Sinsat in the north-west passing through the north of the commune and continuing south-east to Luzenac. Access to the village is by the D522 road which branches off the N20 in the commune and goes south-east through the village continuing to Les Cabannes. A railway line passes through the commune with the nearest station at Les Cabannes. Most of the commune is heavily forested with a strip of farmland along the N20 and the D522.

The river Ariège forms the whole eastern border of the commune with no tributaries passing through the commune.

Neighbouring communes and villages

Administration

List of Successive Mayors

Demography
In 2012 the commune had 56 inhabitants.

See also
Communes of the Ariège department

References

External links
Aulos on the old IGN website 
Aulos on Géoportail, National Geographic Institute (IGN) website 
Aulos on the 1750 Cassini Map

Former communes of Ariège (department)
Populated places disestablished in 2019